The 1987 PBA All-Filipino Conference Finals was the best-of-5 basketball championship series of the 1987 PBA All-Filipino Conference, and the conclusion of the conference playoffs. The Great Taste Coffee Makers and Hills Bros. Coffee Kings played for the 37th championship contested by the league.

Great Taste Coffee Makers won their fifth PBA title and third All-Filipino crown, scoring a 3–0 sweep over Hills Bros. Coffee Kings.

Qualification

Series scoring summary

Games summary

Game 1

Great taste had their largest lead at 109–70, in a surprising lopsided win for the Coffee Makers.

Game 2

Great Taste leads by as much as 16 points in the final quarter but got a scare from a three-point shooting of Naning Valenciano. The Coffee Makers answered every short-lived uprising in the last two minutes with clutch hits by Ricardo Brown and Allan Caidic.

Game 3

Going into the last 12 minutes of the game with Great Taste up by five points, 80–75, a 16–4 run by the Coffee Makers open up a 17-point deficit, 96–79, and looks headed for an easy win and a victory celebration until the Coffee Kings, behind the blazing hands of Bogs Adornado and Ludovico "Naning" Valenciano, suddenly trimmed down the lead to a single margin. The score was 107–99 in favor of Great Taste when Naning Valenciano drained in three consecutive triples in a 9–2 burst as the Coffee Kings came within a point, 108–109, the Coffee Makers didn't call a timeout and Abe King was fouled with four seconds remaining, King muffed his two free throws that gave Hills Bros a chance to reverse the outcome of the game, unfortunately, time ran out as Marte Saldaña failed to score as the buzzer sounded.

Rosters

Broadcast notes

References

1987
1987 PBA season
Great Taste Coffee Makers games
Alaska Aces (PBA) games
PBA All-Filipino Conference Finals